Peter Evans may refer to:

 Peter Evans (actor) (1950–1989), American actor
 Peter Evans (musician), American musician, specializes in improvisation and avant-garde music
 Peter Evans (musicologist) (1929–2018), British musicologist, author of The Music of Benjamin Britten
 Peter Evans (restaurateur) (1926–2014), British restaurateur
 Peter Evans (radio personality) (1927–1985), 3LO breakfast announcer 1965–1986
 Peter Evans (swimmer) (born 1961), Australian swimmer, won a gold medal at the 1980 Summer Olympics
 Peter Evans (sailor) (born 1961), New Zealand Olympic sailor
 Peter Evans (author) (died 2012), British journalist and author
 Peter B. Evans (born 1944), political sociologist
 Peter Evans, fictional character in the Tracy Letts play Bug

See also
 Peter Darvill-Evans (born 1954), British writer and editor